The Grand Prix of Cleveland was an Indy car event in the CART series, held annually at Burke Lakefront Airport in Cleveland, Ohio. The race celebrated its milestone 25th anniversary in 2006. The race was most recently held in 2007. After the 2008 open wheel unification, the 2008 race had to be cancelled. Attempts to revive the race have not yet come to fruition.

Normally a fully functioning airport year-round, Burke Lakefront Airport was shut down for the week leading up to the event each year, requiring careful maintenance of the runways in order to keep them safe for cars at high speeds. The race was very popular amongst fans, as the long, wide, runways (much wider and longer than typical courses) allowed for side-by-side racing, fast speeds, and superb passing zones around the entire track. The layout and overall flatness of the circuit also allowed a view of nearly the entire course from the grandstands.  The track was less popular with drivers, as the runways were much bumpier than normal asphalt courses. The first turn, in which the runway narrowed and the cars turned at an almost 45 degree angle at the end of the front straight, was seen as one of the toughest in the circuit.

History as a CART/ChampCar race
Originally known as the Budweiser Cleveland 500, it was first held on July 4, 1982 as part of the CART series.  Kevin Cogan started from pole position, however to the delight of the Cleveland crowd, local rookie driver Bobby Rahal (from nearby Medina) won the race.

From 1982 to 1989, the race was held on a 2.48-mile layout. In 1990, the track configuration was abruptly changed. After practice, several cars were experiencing problems in a bumpy section in turns one and two. Prior to the start of the race, the track was slightly reconfigured, eliminating the left-right combination of turns one and two. The main straight was extended towards the location of what was turn three, which then became turn one. The new layout measured 2.369 miles, and the segment eliminated became instead an extended exit to the pit road. The new layout was then adopted permanently. In 1997 the track length was remeasured to 2.106 miles without visible changes on the layout. The current layout is known for its turn 1 "vortex" at the start of races - after the green flag dropped, drivers would fan out on the wide concrete to gain position and then arrive at the corner sometimes five or six cars abreast, and all at once be "sucked" into the apex of the corner, frequently resulting in multi-car crashes at or just past the corner and leading to cars retiring before completing a single lap of the race.

The event's name has changed several times over the years to reflect naming rights sponsors of the race, however from 1984 the event has been principally known as the Cleveland Grand Prix.  The name was switched around in 1992 to Grand Prix of Cleveland and has remained the same since.

Twice, in 1984 and 1990, a round of IROC was held as a support race. Formula Lightning also participated as a support race in the mid-1990s.

Budweiser retained naming rights through 1994.  Cleveland-based pharmacy chain Medic Drug owned the rights from 1995 to 1999, Marconi (now Telent plc) from 2000 to 2002, and US Bank owned them from 2003 to 2007.  The full name of the 2006 event was Grand Prix of Cleveland presented by US Bank.

In 2007, it was announced the race would continue at Cleveland through to 2012.  However, the race did not return in 2008 with the merger between the Champ Car and IndyCar.

2006: 25th anniversary
The 25th running of the Grand Prix of Cleveland was held in June 2006.  As well as the Champ Car race, scheduled support events included Champ Car Atlantic, Formula Ford 2000 and Touring Challenge for Corvettes. It was commemorated by a painting of memorable grand prix events, with the background being every winning car entering the first turn.

Indy Racing League controversy
The Cleveland Grand Prix nearly went to the IRL in 2000, but the plan was eventually scuttled. CART officials elected to drop the race from the schedule after a dispute with the promoter over the sanctioning fee.

On June 29, 1999, it was announced that the race would switch alliances and become an event on the Indy Racing League schedule for 2000. The original course layout would be transformed into an oval configuration approximately 1.2 miles in length. A three-year initial contract was signed. The decision was not well received by fans. Weeks later, however, it was determined that construction necessary for the oval configuration would require FAA approval, and the city deemed the improvements excessive and not enhancing to the airport. On September 9, 1999, Cleveland Mayor Michael R. White announced he was withdrawing his support of the project, and the IRL dropped the event. In 2000, the race returned as a Champ Car event on the original course.

Lap Records
The all-time outright unofficial track record on the original circuit layout is 1:04.636 seconds, set by Mario Andretti in a Lola T89/00, during qualifying for the 1989 Budweiser Grand Prix of Cleveland. The outright track record on the later modified Grand Prix Circuit layout is 56.417 seconds, set by Jimmy Vasser in a Reynard 98I, during qualifying for the 1998 Medic Drug Grand Prix of Cleveland. The official race lap records at the Grand Prix of Cleveland are listed as:

Past race winners

Lights/Atlantics winners

References

External links

 

 
International Race of Champions tracks
Champ Car circuits
Motorsport venues in Ohio
Defunct motorsport venues in the United States